The Credit Rating Agency Reform Act is a United States federal law whose goal is to improve ratings quality for the protection of investors and in the public interest by fostering accountability, transparency, and competition in the credit rating agency industry.

Enacted after being signed by President Bush on September 29, 2006, it amended the Securities Exchange Act of 1934 to require nationally recognized statistical rating organizations (NRSROs) to register with the Securities and Exchange Commission (SEC).

Critics had complained that the dominance of "the big three" rating agencies – Standard & Poor's Ratings Services, Moody's Investors Service and the smaller Fitch Rating—were in part responsible for the subprime mortgage crisis of 2006–8. The agencies rated 98% of the trillions of dollars of home-mortgage oriented "structured investment" products. Hundreds of billions of dollars' worth of securities given the agencies highest—triple-A—rating were later downgraded to "junk" status, and the writedowns and losses came to over half a trillion dollars.

The Act permitted smaller, newer credit rating agencies to register as "statistical ratings organizations".  The intent of the U.S. Congress was to increase the choice for consumers by opening the market to a greater number of ratings agencies, and also to incent accurate and reliable ratings.

Effectiveness of act
However, in the 12 months that ended in June 2011, the SEC found the big three still issued 97% of all credit ratings, down from 98% in 2007.  McClatchy Newspapers found that "little competition has emerged in rating the kinds of complex home-mortgage securities whose implosion led to the 2007 financial crisis".

Critics have complained that the criteria to designate a rating agency as "a nationally recognized statistical rating organization" was written by a "yet-to-be-identified official of one of the big three ratings agencies" and is so difficult it has "prevented at least one potential competitor from winning approval and have dissuaded others from even applying".  According to critics, the law has set "odd barriers that are very favorable to the incumbents," made it "exceptionally difficult for a younger player to qualify" as a SEC recognized agency, and "absolutely slammed the door on any new competition" in structured products—"the most lucrative part of the ratings business".

See also

 Securities regulation in the United States
 Commodity Futures Trading Commission
 Securities Commission
 Chicago Stock Exchange
 Financial regulation
 List of financial regulatory authorities by country
 NASDAQ
 New York Stock Exchange
 Stock exchange
 Regulation D (SEC)
Related legislation
 1933 – Securities Act of 1933
 1934 – Securities Exchange Act of 1934
 1938 – Temporary National Economic Committee (establishment)
 1939 – Trust Indenture Act of 1939
 1940 – Investment Advisers Act of 1940
 1940 – Investment Company Act of 1940
 1968 – Williams Act (Securities Disclosure Act)
 1975 – Securities and Exchange Act
 1982 – Garn–St. Germain Depository Institutions Act
 1999 – Gramm–Leach–Bliley Act
 2000 – Commodity Futures Modernization Act of 2000
 2002 – Sarbanes–Oxley Act
 2003 – Fair and Accurate Credit Transactions Act of 2003
 2010 – Dodd–Frank Wall Street Reform and Consumer Protection Act

References

External links
the Act
United States Securities and Exchange Commission (SEC) – Official site

U.S. Securities and Exchange Commission
Acts of the 109th United States Congress
United States federal securities legislation
Credit rating